Pittwater Road is an urban Main Road in the north-eastern suburbs of Sydney, Australia.  Pittwater Road runs from Manly to Church Point, on the southern shore of Pittwater. It passes through the suburbs of North Manly, Brookvale, Dee Why, Collaroy, Narrabeen, North Narrabeen, Warriewood, Mona Vale and Bayview. There are about 2,200 houses along the road.

Route
Pittwater Road is the main road along the coast of the Northern Beaches suburbs, from Manly to Mona Vale. Between its intersection with Condamine Street, at Brookvale, and its intersection with Mona Vale Road, at Mona Vale, Pittwater Road forms part of the A8 route. Most of Pittwater Road is a concrete slab road laid in the 1930s, and mostly has three lanes in each direction.

North of Mona Vale, Pittwater Road heads north-west, as a narrow, winding, two-lane road, to the shore of Pittwater at Bayview and Church Point.  The main road to the remaining northern beach suburbs, up to Palm Beach, is Barrenjoey Road, which appears to be a continuation of Pittwater Road at Mona Vale. Being the largest single arterial road in the area, it is often referred to simply as "the main road".

A separate Pittwater Road is a local arterial in the northern suburbs west of the Lane Cove River. This section of the road begins in the south at the junction with Victoria Road in Gladesville, and proceeds through East Ryde and North Ryde until it joins Epping Road, and the road name ends a short distance to the north in Macquarie Park. The two Pittwater Roads are connected between Gordon and Mona Vale by the A3 arterial road, which is formed by Lane Cove Road and Mona Vale Road in this section. In former times, much of present-day Mona Vale Road through St. Ives, Terrey Hills and Ingleside, was known by varying names, including "Pittwater Road".

History
The passing of the Main Roads Act of 1924 through the Parliament of New South Wales provided for the declaration of Main Roads, roads partially funded by the State government through the Main Roads Board (later the Department of Main Roads, and eventually Transport for NSW). Main Road No. 159 was declared from the intersection with Condamine Street in North Manly to the intersection with Belgrave Street in Manly (then continuing south along Belgrave Street then west via Sydney Road to Balgowah), Main Road No. 164 was declared from the intersection with Condamine Street in North Manly, via Dee Why and Narrabeen to Mona Vale (and continuing north via Barrenjoey Road to Newport), and Main Road No. 174 was declared from Mona Vale, via Bayview to Chirch Point, on the same day, 8 August 1929.

The route was allocated State Route 14 in 1974 between Mona Vale and North Manly; this was later replaced by Metroad 10 in 1998. It was also allocated State Route 12 between Manly and Queenscliff in 1974 (where it diverted via Oliver Street via Curl Curl to meet Pittwater Road in Dee Why); this was realigned to follow Pittwater Road through to the intersection with Condamine Street in North Manly in 1993, but was decommissioned shortly after in 1995. With the conversion to the newer alphanumeric system in 2013, Metroad 10 was replaced with route A8.

References

See also

Highways in Australia
Streets in Sydney
Manly, New South Wales